The String Sextet, Op. 1, is a string sextet in four movements by Graham Waterhouse. While the composer began the work as one movement in 1979, he completed it in four movements in 2013. The completed version was first performed at the Gasteig in Munich on 9 February 2014.

History 

While still at Highgate School, Waterhouse intended to compose a string sextet, following models such as the first String Sextet by Brahms. He composed one movement which was performed for a school music competition. It was the first work he found worthy of an opus number. The Boulez pupil and scholar Susan Bradshaw commented: "while searching for an independent voice, it still didn't sound like anyone else".
 
A second movement was begun in 1983 as part of university studies in fugue. The third movement was conceived on a trip to Czechoslovakia and Poland in the mid-1980s. The fourth movement was begun at the same time and is based on a theme from Macedonia. Both the third and the fourth movement were completed in 2013, 34 years after the beginning of the work.

Structure and music
The work for two violins, two violas and two cellos is in four movements:
 Allegro con anima
 Fugue – Adagio fanatico
 Scherzo – Allegro vivace
 Moderato (basato su ricordi di un tema macedone)

The first movement is tonal music in sonata form, reminiscent of the sextets by Johannes Brahms. The second movement, marked "Adagio fanatico", is a fugue which follows Baroque forms but uses a "slightly abrasive, modal harmonic language". It features a rhythmic ostinato. In the Scherzo, the strings play layered ("geschichtet"). The fial movement is domiated by a Macedonian folksong with characteristic rhythms. From the beginning, the work has clear contours and skilful sextet sound.

Performances 
After the first performance at Highgate school, the first movement was performed again at chamber concert at Cambridge University in 1982. The completed version was first performed at the Gasteig in Munich on 9 February 2014 in a program of chamber music by Mozart and Waterhouse, with the members of the Munich Philharmonic and the composer as the cellist. The UK premiere was played on 1 May 2016 as part of the Whittall Barn Concert Series by the Anern Trio and the Waterhouse Trio, along with the string trios Zeichenstaub and Epitaphium. The sextet was notably played as part of GW60, a concert on 5 November 2022 at the Allerheiligen-Hofkirche in Munich to celebrate the composer's 60th birthday. The performers were David Frühwirth, Clément Courtin, Konstantin Sellheim, Valentin Eichler, Katerina Giannitsioti and the composer.

In preparation for publication by Schott Music, Waterhouse then dedicated the composition to his mother, Elisabeth Waterhouse, saying that her lifelong dedication to chamber music, especially her pioneering work at the Summer Schools from the mid-1970s, was a major inspiration for the work.

References

External links
 

Chamber music by Graham Waterhouse
Compositions for string sextet
Contemporary classical compositions
2010 compositions